La Vegueta is a village in Tinajo, Las Palmas province of western Lanzarote in the Canary Islands, Spain.

Populated places in Lanzarote